Cryptocranium is a genus of longhorn beetles of the subfamily Lamiinae, containing the following species:

 Cryptocranium cazieri Lane, 1958
 Cryptocranium laterale Audinet-Serville, 1835

References

Pteropliini